North Carolina Highway 279 (NC 279) is a primary state highway in the U.S. state of North Carolina. It connects the cities of Cherryville, Dallas, and Gastonia.

Route description

History
Established in January 1979 as a renumbering of NC 277, it originally traversed from Cherryville to NC 275, in Dallas. In November 1979, NC 279 was extended southeast to the South Carolina state line; overlapping with NC 150 through Dallas and upgrading secondary roads Lower Dallas Highway (SR 2264) and New Hope Road (SR 2302). At some unknown date, NC 279's western terminus was redirected from the intersection of Church and Mountain streets to Church Street and Rudsil Avenue, in Cherryville.

North Carolina Highway 277

North Carolina Highway 277 (NC 277) was established in 1931 as a new primary routing; it connected U.S. Route 74 (US 74)/NC 20, in Gastonia to NC 150 in Cherryville. In 1936, its southern terminus was truncated at NC 275 in Dallas. In 1938, its western terminus was moved through downtown Cherryville to NC 274; it is unknown when it was overlapped with NC 274 to end at Church and Mountain streets.  Between 1954 and 1957, the alignment along the route was straightened, creating several small loop roads along the route, several of which say "Old NC 277". In 1979, NC 277 was renumbered to NC 279, to accommodate for Interstate 277.

Junction list

References

External links

 
 NCRoads.com: N.C. 277
 NCRoads.com: N.C. 279

279
Transportation in Gaston County, North Carolina